Thale Rushfeldt Deila (born 15 January 2000) is a Norwegian handball player who plays for Molde Elite.

She also represented Norway at the 2017 European Women's U-17 Handball Championship, were she received silver and at the 2018 Women's Youth World Handball Championship, placing 11th.

Achievements
European Championship:
Winner: 2022
Youth European Championship:
Silver Medalist: 2017
Norwegian Cup:
Finalist: 2021

Personal life
She is the twin sister of Live Rushfeldt Deila and daughter of former international footballer Ronny Deila.

References

2000 births
Living people
Norwegian female handball players
Twin sportspeople
Norwegian twins
Sportspeople from Porsgrunn